WSCG-LD, virtual and UHF digital channel 14, is a low-power Court TV-affiliated television station licensed to Beaufort, South Carolina, United States. The station is owned by Marquee Broadcasting. WSCG-LD's studios are located on Sams Point Road in Beaufort, and its transmitter is located on Parris Island Parkway in Port Royal, South Carolina.

WGCB-LD (virtual channel 35, UHF digital channel 36), licensed to both Hinesville and Richmond Hill, operates as a translator of WSCG-LD; this station's transmitter is located near Bloomingdale, Georgia.

Subchannels
The stations' digital signals are multiplexed:

References

SCG-LD
Low-power television stations in the United States
Television channels and stations established in 1994
1994 establishments in South Carolina
Court TV affiliates
Ion Mystery affiliates
TheGrio affiliates
Buzzr affiliates
GetTV affiliates
NewsNet affiliates
Marquee Broadcasting